Sinner is a 2007 drama film directed by Marc Benardout and starring Nick Chinlund, Georgina Cates, Michael E. Rodgers, Tom Wright, and Brad Dourif.

The film debuted on Showtime on April 3, 2009 and was released on DVD in June 2009 in North America by Matson Films.

Plot
A Catholic priest, Father Anthony Romano (Nick Chinlund), intervenes with the police when his colleague attacks a drifter named Lil (Georgina Cates). When Anthony reluctantly provides her asylum in his rectory, the brash hustler soon discovers a secret he has hidden from his diocese and parish. Through this unlikely muse, Anthony finds a path to regain his honor and calling in a post-scandal world where priests are guilty until proven innocent.

Cast
 Nick Chinlund as Anthony
 Georgina Cates as Lil
 Michael E. Rodgers as Stephen
 Brad Dourif as Caddie
 Tom Wright as Officer Thomas

Festivals
Sinner was chosen as an official selection in the 2007 Vail Film Festival, 2007 Newport Beach Film Festival, 41st Annual Brooklyn Arts Council Film and Video Festival, 2007 Palm Beach International Film Festival, 2007 Garden State Film Festival, 2007 Buffalo Niagara Film Festival, and the 2007 Boston International Film Festival.

Awards
 Best Feature Film (Narrative), 41st Annual Brooklyn Arts Council International Film & Video Festival
 Best Feature Film, 2007 Buffalo Niagara Film Festival
 Best Director, 2007 Boston International Film Festival
 Best Screenplay, 2007 Newport  Beach Film Festival
 Best Actor, 41st Annual Brooklyn Arts Council International Film & Video Festival
 Best Actress, 41st Annual Brooklyn Arts Council International Film & Video Festival
 Best Screenplay, 41st Annual Brooklyn Arts Council International Film & Video Festival
 Best Cinematography, 41st Annual Brooklyn Arts Council International Film & Video Festival

References

External links
 
 
 Film Threat review
 Independent Catholic News review
 ReelTalk review
 Interview in BuffaloRising.com
 Static Multimedia review
 DVD Verdict review

2009 drama films
2009 films
2007 films
American independent films
Films about Catholic priests
Films about religion
Films scored by Pinar Toprak
American drama films
2007 independent films
2007 drama films
2000s English-language films
2000s American films
English-language drama films